Warsheikh is an administration center and  coastal town of Warsheikh district. Warsheikh is located in the southeastern Middle Shabelle region of Hirshabelle State of  Somalia. On the south, Warsheikh is bordered by the Banadir region, and on the north Adale District.  

Warsheikh was known to the ancient Greeks as Sarapion. Warsheikh is situated about 70 km on the coast north of Mogadishu. Warsheikh is important historical Islamic center and has been centre of trade and learning in the region.

Etymology 
The origins of the name Warsheikh ( has theory based on oral history and goes the following; 

According to oral tales, the name ‘Warsheik’ was coined by religious scholars who wanted to spread the Islamic religion in Somalia. They felt thirsty after a long journey, and then they raised their hands to pray to Allah to give them water to drink. Allah answered their prayers. They saw the splash of water on the ground a few steps away. After drinking the water, they met pastoralist family and asked for food and hospitality, but the family said there is no water to prepare food on, then the scholar said, “Don’t worry about it go there and you will find water". The found water on the place the scholar water told her about, then the other villagers saw her carrying a Jerry-can and asked her where she gets the water from, she replied that the Sheik told her the information and she followed it (literally; Warkii (information) Sheekha (religious scholar).

History

Warsheikh is an early Muslim center in southern Somalia, Warsheikh was one of the principal settlements of the Sultanate of Mogadishu during the Middle Ages. The town has an old mosque situated near a cape, which features an inscription noting its construction in 1278H (1861–1862 CE) by Sheikh Abu Bakr b. Mihzar b. Ahmad al-Kasadi. The masjid has three rows of transverse, east-west piers, and a foliate mihrab. It also has attached chambers, with the Sheikh's tomb situated in an adjacent room.

During the Middle Ages, Warsheikh and much of the surrounding area in southern Somalia was governed by the Ajuran Sultanate. The town later came under the administration of the Hiraab Imamate in the late 17th century after the collapse of the powerful Ajuran Empire. At the turn of the 20th century, Warsheikh was incorporated into the Italian Somaliland protectorate. After independence in 1960, the town was made the administration center of the official Warsheikh District.

Over the course of three archaeological expeditions in Warsheikh between 1920 and 1921, Enrico Cerulli uncovered coins from the medieval Sultans of Mogadishu. They were deposited in the Scuola Orientale of the University of Rome, but were later lost in World War II. According to Cerulli, similar coins were found in the village of Mos (Moos), located about 14 km to Warsheikh's northwest. Freeman-Grenville (1963) also record another discovery of ancient coins in the latter town.

Demographics
The population of Warsheikh center does not have official figures but is estimated at approximately 65,000. While the broader Warsheikh District has an estimated population of 150,573  residents as of 2016. The district is exclusively inhabited by Abgaal of the Hawiye clan. Especially Cumar Galmaax (Celi and Mataan).

Economy 

Warsheikh has various resources such as livestock, marine resources and agricultural production which gives the district several economic and productivity opportunities. But following the collapse of the military regime of Said Barre, the town shared with other districts in the Middle Shabelle region various challenges in terms of security, economy and society. On the hand, the absence of a functioning government during the post-crisis period has created a climate of consultation and collaboration among the local community to overcome the crisis of the time with internal and external mobilizations so that the local community can play an active role in the recovery. restoring life in the district.

Tourism 

Tourism in Somalia is regulated by the Federal Government of Somalia's Ministry of Tourism. After the start of the civil war in the early 1990s, the Tourism Ministry shut down operations. It was re-established in the 2000s, and once again oversees the national tourist industry. The Mogadishu-based Somali Tourism Association (SOMTA) provides on-the-ground consulting services.

The district is located on the long coastline of Somalia and has attractive beaches. The district is near the capital Mogadishu and in this connection attracts tourists from the capital and nearby districts with its less crowded beaches. Majority off the tourists are young students on weekend trips from the capital, while others are Somali diasporas from different countries around the world. The tourists experience the beaches, sand dunes and other attractions such as visiting Alifuuto Nature Reserve and grassland area.

District administration 
The districts have undergone various administrations during the revolution, the collapse of central government, the civil war, the Transitional Federal Government (TFG) period, and the current government in Somalia. On Thursday, 02 July 2015, Colonel Ahmed Hussein Ahmed (Shidka) was officially appointed as the new district commissioner of Warsheikh District by the Ministry of Interior of Somalia. 
But in 2019 the district held an election, Hassan Mohamed Ahmed were elected in as district commissioner and chairman of the district council by the residents. Hassan Ahmed become the first district commissioner in Hirshabelle state of Somalia to be elected by the local council, a shift from previous appointments where previous commissioners were selected by the Federal Member States.

Warsheikh district has a local council consisting of 21 person and is headed by a district commissioner. Term length of the elected district council leadership is 4 years.

Sub-districts and villages 
The Warsheikh district consists of 45 villages. Following are names of sub-districts and villages of broader Warsheikh District.

Bakaaroole, Cadayo, Ceel Cusub, Ceel Jaamac, Ceel Macaan, Ceelbashaqley, Ceelow, Cisaleey, Deebley, Fila-Dheere, Hawaay, Kaxyalo, Koogaar, Kulanley, Maaxaay, Malableey, Maraweyne, Nagaadi, Qeylo-Weyne, Qorilow, Ruun-Shiikow, Sheeq-Yaale, Sigaale, Timere, War Dhagax, Xamaroow, Xaluule. Yaq-Qoley and Yay-Goley

Landmarks 
Warsheikh has several landmarks and noticeable places both from historic periods and from later times. Some of the landmarks and buildings date back to centuries. Following are known landmarks both from the town and from the broader Warsheikh district. 
 Sirmaqabe mosque
 Warsheikh Grand Mosque (Masajidka Jaamaca Warsheekh) 
 Alifuto nature reserve
 Taallada (The statue)
 The old mosque of Warsheikh

The Casa Sul Mare (House On The Sea)

The Casa Sul Mare building from 1800s is over 100 years ago and reported  to be one of the very historical buildings in Warsheikh. The building is from colonial times, when Italy controlled Warsheikh. The colonial power at the time used the coastline of Warsheikh as one of several ports that commercially connected the southern part of Somalia with the rest of the world.

Health and education 
Warsheikh has a modest community hospital. The hospital covers basic needs and provides health services to the residents of Warsheikh and surrounding villages. The hospital was established and is funded by WARMOCAD Umbrella Organization, an organization by diaspora organizations and individuals originating from Warsheikh. It has been possible to implement a number of educational development projects in the district with the participation of locals and diasporas from the District with the help of international agencies. The Districts Primary and Middle School was built to improve the District's educational activities.

Notable people 
 Sheikh Abdirahman Sheikh Omar, grand sheikh and scholar of islam
 Sheikh Muhumed Sheikh Abdirahman Eli, scholar and son of Sheikh Abdirahman
 Haji Mahamud Hassan (Sirmaqabe), religious scholar

Notes

References

Warsheikh, Somalia
Parks, reserves, and the protected areas in Somalia. http://www.parks.it/world/SO/Eindex.html
Article about tourism in Warsheikh. http://somalisafari.com/destination/warsheikh/
Somali article on the local hospital of Warsheikh. https://www.starfmsomalia.com/wareysi-isbitaalka-degmada-warsheekh/
Somali article on "the history of Warsheikh district and the new leadership". https://warsheekh.com/articles/25931/Warbixin-Taariikhda-degmada-Warsheekh-iyo-Hogaanka-cusub-ee-dhawaan-yeelatay-Sawirohttp:/warsheekh.com/articles/25931/Warbixin-Taariikhda-degmada-Warsheekh-iyo-Hogaanka-cusub-ee-dhawaan-yeelatay-Sawiro 

Populated places in Middle Shabelle
Ajuran Sultanate